The athletics competition at the 1983 Southeast Asian Games was held at the National Stadium, Singapore.

Medal summary

Men

Women

Medal table

References

 https://eresources.nlb.gov.sg/newspapers/Digitised/Article/straitstimes19830602-1.2.102
 https://eresources.nlb.gov.sg/newspapers/Digitised/Article/straitstimes19830603-1.2.129
 https://eresources.nlb.gov.sg/newspapers/Digitised/Article/straitstimes19830605-1.2.78.27
 https://eresources.nlb.gov.sg/newspapers/Digitised/Article/straitstimes19830606-1.2.102
Southeast Asian Games. GBR Athletics. Retrieved 2020-02-08.

Athletics
1983
Southeast Asian Games
1983 Southeast Asian Games